The Phantom Melody is a 1920 American silent drama film directed by Douglas Gerrard, and starring Monroe Salisbury, Henry A. Barrows, Ray Gallagher, Charles West and Jean Calhoun. The film was released by Universal Film Manufacturing Company on January 27, 1920. The film's "premature burial" plotline tilts it in the direction of being a horror film as well as a melodrama. Director Gerrard emigrated to Hollywood from Ireland in 1913 to become an actor, but quickly gravitated to film directing in 1916 with his The Price of Victory, but gave up directing soon after filming The Phantom Melody.

Plot
A wealthy count named Camello is in love with Mary Drake, but his cousin Gregory Baldi is also pursuing her. World War 2 breaks out, and Gregory is thought to have been killed in action. The Count succeeds in getting Mary to marry him, but on the eve of their wedding, Gregory returns home alive. Seeking to rid himself of his rival, Gregory buries Camello alive in an underground vault. Camello manages to get free and engages Gregory in a deadly duel.

Cast
Monroe Salisbury as Count Camello
Jean Calhoun as Mary Drake
Charles West as Gregory Baldi
Henry A. Barrows as Sir James Drake
Ray Gallagher as His Son Oliver
Joe Ray as Gustave Tornelli
Milton Markwell as Baron Ferrera
Lois Lee as Paulette

Preservation
The film is now considered lost.

References

External links

1920 drama films
Silent American drama films
1920 films
American silent feature films
American black-and-white films
Lost American films
Universal Pictures films
1920s American films
1920 lost films
Lost drama films
1920s English-language films
English-language drama films